Roman Stupnicki (30 November 1913 – 27 January 1954) was a Polish ice hockey player. He played for Czarni Lwów during his career. He also played for the Polish national team at the 1936 Winter Olympics.

References

External links
 

1913 births
1954 deaths
Ice hockey players at the 1936 Winter Olympics
Olympic ice hockey players of Poland
Polish ice hockey forwards
Sportspeople from Lviv
People from the Kingdom of Galicia and Lodomeria